Dean Daley-Jones is an Australian actor who played the lead role in the 2010 film Mad Bastards which was directed by Brendan Fletcher. He had a supporting role in Ivan Sen's 2011 film, Toomelah. He has also had roles in Australian television series Redfern Now and The Gods of Wheat Street.

Background
Dean Daley Jones is a member of the Nyoongar tribe.

Daley-Jones had had trouble with the law which was evident in his late 20s. In 2007 and aged in his mid 30s, he moved to Broome to get a new start. He then began his quest to change things in his life and was working as a builder's laborer. One day he found out about a "Blackfella" film being made in the area and he showed up for a job as a crewman. He started off with him doing manual work carrying and move equipment. He gave an account of his own life story to contribute to the film Mad Bastards, and ended up getting the lead role. The character he played in the film, TJ wasn't too far from the man he used to be. He had anger issues due to the way his people were treated. He didn't always deal with situations in the right way. He was aware of the impact and the message portrayed in the film and who it can reach.

Daley-Jones ended up being a mentor to Aboriginal prisoners. It started when Lea McKay, the coordinator of Aboriginal prison services watched Mad Bastards and seeing Daley-Jones in it she knew she had to get hold of him. As a result he visited Casuarina Prison to talk to Aboriginal prisoners about breaking the crime cycle.

Film career
In Mad Bastards he plays the part of TJ, who is the father of a boy who has had trouble with the law. The boy's grandfather  (played by Greg Tait) is the local policeman Texas . He sends him to a camp for a couple of weeks. TJ and Texas eventually clash physically.
He was interviewed by Onya Magazine about his work in the film.

He had a role in the 2011 film, Toomelah which was directed by Ivan Sen. In the film he plays the part of Bruce a gang leader. Also that year, "Walk Tall, Stand Strong'" was released.  Part of the sixth season of Deadly Yarns, he both wrote and directed the documentary short.

In Redfern Now he played the part of a tough late 30s, Aboriginal man Indigo who is released from jail for killing a man in a street fight. He has to deal with certain personal issues, one of which is his thoughts on his wife's fidelity.

He had a role in the 2018 film, Flotsam Jetsam which was directed by Banjo Fitzsimon and featured other actors, Michael Gupta, Richard Green (XXIV), Hunter McMahon, Geraldine Hakewill and Sean Barker.

Filmography

Further reading
 Onya Magazine, May 17, 2011  - Dean Daley-Hughes, Actor By Matthew Pejkovic

References

External links

Living people
Australian male television actors
21st-century Australian male actors
Indigenous Australian male actors
Year of birth missing (living people)